San Marcos Civic Center is a station on North County Transit District's SPRINTER light rail line. It serves the heart of San Marcos, California. It is located at the intersection of San Marcos Boulevard and West Mission Road. A preview service stopped at San Marcos Civic Center on December 28, 2007, and regular service commenced March 9, 2008.

Platforms and tracks

References

External links
SPRINTER Stations

North County Transit District stations
Railway stations in the United States opened in 2008
San Marcos, California
2008 establishments in California